Bazzoni is an Italian surname. Notable people with the surname include:

Alberto Bazzoni (1889–1973), Italian sculptor
Alessandro Bazzoni (born 1933), former Italian soccer player
Camillo Bazzoni (born 1934), Italian cinematographer and film director
Chiara Bazzoni (born 1984), Italian sprinter (400 meters)
Luigi Bazzoni (1929-2012), Italian director and screenwriter
Raffaele Bazzoni (born 1953), Italian politician 

Italian-language surnames